Parrillo is an Italian surname. Notable people with the surname include:

Benjamin John Parrillo, American actor, writer and director
Lucio Parrillo (born 1974), Italian artist
Robert J. Parrillo (born 1941), American businessman and lawyer
Vincent N. Parrillo (born 1938), American sociologist

Italian-language surnames